Hans-Olof "Hasse" Holmqvist (27 April 1960) is a Swedish former professional footballer who played as a forward. He represented Djurgårdens IF, Hammarby IF, Fortuna Düsseldorf, Young Boys, Cesena, and Örebro SK during a career that spanned between 1979 and 1992. A full international between 1983 and 1988, he won 27 caps and scored four goals for the Sweden national team.

Career statistics 

Scores and results list Sweden's goal tally first, score column indicates score after each Holmqvist goal.

Honours 

 Djurgårdens IF
 Division 2 Norra: 1982
Individual

 Stor Grabb: 1987

References

Swedish footballers
Sweden international footballers
Allsvenskan players
Bundesliga players
Swiss Super League players
Serie A players
Djurgårdens IF Fotboll players
Hammarby Fotboll players
Fortuna Düsseldorf players
BSC Young Boys players
A.C. Cesena players
Örebro SK players
Swedish expatriate footballers
Expatriate footballers in Germany
Expatriate footballers in Switzerland
Expatriate footballers in Italy
1960 births
Living people
Association football forwards
Footballers from Stockholm